Zhang Jian (born 5 April 1976) is a retired Chinese middle distance runner who specialized in the 800 metres. She participated at the 1996 Summer Olympics.

Her personal best time was 1.58.98 minutes, achieved in October 1997 in Shanghai.

Achievements

References

1976 births
Living people
Chinese female middle-distance runners
Athletes (track and field) at the 1996 Summer Olympics
Olympic athletes of China